The Kingle Valley Bridge, officially known as the Connecticut Avenue Bridge, is an Art Deco steel-arch bridge located near the National Zoological Park on Connecticut Avenue, Northwest in Washington, D.C. The bridge crosses Klingle Valley, running from Macomb Street to Devonshire Place and connecting the Cleveland Park and Woodley Park neighborhoods.

The bridge replaced an earlier one built around 1890 by real estate developer and sitting U.S. Representative Francis Newlands, D-Nevada, as part of his effort to create the streetcar suburb of Chevy Chase, Maryland. 

The bridge was designed by architect Paul Philippe Cret and engineer Ralph Modjeski. It was built in 1931–1932. There is no direct connection between Connecticut Avenue and Klingle Road in the narrow valley below. The bridge features two historic lights on each corner. A major rehabilitation of the bridge that began in 2005 included restored ornamental lanterns, refurbished masonry, and additional street lights. The restoration project was completed in 2008.

On May 21, 2004, the bridge was added to the National Register of Historic Places. It is a contributing property to the Cleveland Park Historic District.

See also
 List of bridges documented by the Historic American Engineering Record in Washington, D.C.
 List of bridges on the National Register of Historic Places in Washington, D.C.
 National Register of Historic Places listings in the District of Columbia

References

External links

National Register of Historic Places
Two Die When Car Plunges Off Connecticut Ave. Bridge

Art Deco architecture in Washington, D.C.
Bridges completed in 1932
Road bridges on the National Register of Historic Places in Washington, D.C.
Paul Philippe Cret buildings
Historic American Engineering Record in Washington, D.C.
Individually listed contributing properties to historic districts on the National Register in Washington, D.C.
Open-spandrel deck arch bridges in the United States
Steel bridges in the United States
1932 establishments in Washington, D.C.